Thomas Coningsby I (fl. 1559), of Leominster, was an English politician.

He was a Member (MP) of the Parliament of England for Leominster in 1559.

His son was Thomas Coningsby II (died 1616), also an MP.

References

English MPs 1559
People from Leominster
Place of birth unknown
Place of death unknown
Year of birth unknown
Year of death unknown